Sign of the Anchor (Czech:Znamení kotvy) is a 1947 Czech drama film directed by František Čáp and starring Hana Vítová, Zdeňka Baldová and Vlasta Fabianová.

The film's art direction was by Štěpán Kopecký.

Cast
 Hana Vítová as Pavla Marková aka Miss Camilla
 Zdeňka Baldová as Pavla's mother
 Vlasta Fabianová as Prostitute Černá Fanka
 Eduard Kohout as Maestro Lascari
 Zdeněk Štěpánek as Captain Troska
 Július Pántik as Wheelsman Franta Hojdar
 Ladislav H. Struna as Wheelsman Hojdar
 Jarmila Smejkalová as Seamstress Růža
 Vladimír Salač as Cabin boy Lojza Brůha
 Josef Maršálek as Greaser Toník Truneček
 Jan W. Speerger as Boatman
 Jaroslav Zrotal as Vojta
 Karel Effa as Cabin boy Pobříslo
 Ota Motyčka as Innkeeper Krůta
 František Dibarbora as Customs officer

References

External links
 

1947 films
1947 drama films
1940s Czech-language films
Czech drama films
Films directed by František Čáp
Czechoslovak black-and-white films
Czechoslovak drama films
1940s Czech films